"Earth Moving" is a single by musician Mike Oldfield, released in 1989. It is from the album of the same name. "Earth Moving" features  Nikki Lamborn on vocals.

Artwork 
The single artwork was by Storm Thorgerson and Colin Chambers, with a photo by Andy Earl. The location for the photoshoot was Studio Tank in west London using a Bronica 6x7 daylight ektachrome. The single artwork is very similar to the album artwork.

Music video 
The "Earth Moving" music video is available on the Elements – The Best of Mike Oldfield video and features numerous visual references to the planet earth and rubbish.

Track listing 
 "Earth Moving" (Disco Version) – 4:02
 "Earth Moving" – 4:04
 "Bridge to Paradise" – 4:37

Charts

References 

1989 singles
Mike Oldfield songs
Songs written by Mike Oldfield
1989 songs
Virgin Records singles